The Great Synagogue was a synagogue located in Białystok, Poland, which was built between 1909-1913 and designed by Szlojme Rabinowicz. The synagogue was burnt down by Germans on June 27, 1941, with an estimated number of 2,000 Jews inside.

History
The synagogue was located on Suraska Street. Construction began in 1909, and the building was completed in 1913. It was designed by Szlojme (Shlomo) Jakow Rabinowicz and included three Byzantine style domes: a large one with a ten-meter spire over the main hall with two smaller ones flanking it over the side halls.

On the morning of June 27, 1941, Nazi troops from Police Battalion 309 of the Ordnungspolizei surrounded the town square by the Great Synagogue and forced residents from their homes into the street. Some were shoved up against building walls and shot dead. Others, some 2,000 men, women and children, were locked in the synagogue, which was then set on fire; there they burned to death. The Nazi onslaught continued with the grenading of numerous homes and further shootings. As the flames from the synagogue spread and merged with the grenade fires, the entire square was engulfed. On that day, some 3,000 Jews lost their lives.  (Archive from GeoCities)

Monument

A reconstruction of the destroyed dome and a memorial plaque were dedicated in August 1995. The plaque reads: "Our splendid sanctuary fell victim to the flames on June 27, 1941. 2000 Jews were burnt alive in it by the German Nazi murderers."

References

 Rose Markus Schachner The Museum of Family History
 The Great Synagogue in Bialystok - the Place of Faith, Memory and Hope  Zchor

External links

Former synagogues in Poland
Jews and Judaism in Białystok
Synagogues in Poland destroyed by Nazi Germany
Buildings and structures in Białystok
Synagogue buildings with domes
Synagogues completed in 1913
Jewish organizations established in 1913
Byzantine Revival synagogues
20th-century religious buildings and structures in Poland